Winnipeg's Contemporary Dancers is Canada's longest continuously running modern dance company. Founded in 1964 by Rachel Browne, it has presented works in the Rachel Browne Theatre in Winnipeg  as well as locations across Canada and the United States. The company has created dances in the traditional modern dance style as well as avant-garde and expressionistic dance-theatre. Its current artistic director is Jolene Bailie.

Creation

Winnipeg's Contemporary Dancers was formed in 1964 as a student group by Rachel Browne. It was recognised as a fully professional dance company in 1971 and begun receiving Canada Council grants. They performed works by a variety of American choreographers like James Waring and Dan Wagoner and also performed new works by upcoming Canadian choreographers like Jennifer Wootton Mascall and Linda Rabin. Browne encouraged her dancers to also choreograph for the company and created works herself that reflected her humanistic viewpoints. Browne worked in the company as artistic director, resident choreographer and teacher.

Post-Browne era

In 1983 Browne was ousted as artistic director and replaced by Bill Evans. In 1984 Tedd Robinson was appointed artistic director. Robinson focused on an avant-garde style of choreography and remained with the company until 1990.

Charles Moulton was appointed artistic director in 1990 which was a tumultuous season, leaving to company with an enormous deficit. The company regrouped under Tom Stroud in 1991 who remained the artistic director for fourteen years. He created three works with the company that were based on William Shakespeare's plays and focused on expressionistic dance-theater. In 2005 Brent Lott was promoted from dancer in the company to artistic director. In 2019, Jolene Bailie was appointed Artistic Director. Jolene Bailie is the first woman to lead the company since its founder, Rachel Browne.

Notes

Dance companies in Canada
Performing groups established in 1964
Modern dance companies